Celson Ricardo Borges de Jesus (born 11 December 1978), known as just Celson, is a Brazilian football player. He plays for Široki Brijeg in Bosnia since he signed from Colo-Colo of Brazil in March 2006.

Celson came to Široki Brijeg during the winter-break of the 2005–06 Premier League of Bosnia and Herzegovina.

References

1978 births
Living people
Brazilian footballers
Brazilian expatriate footballers
Expatriate footballers in Bosnia and Herzegovina
Association football forwards
NK Široki Brijeg players